.
Claudine Meire (born February 24, 1947) is a former French athlete, who specialised in the sprints.

Biography  
Featured four times in French team athletics, she won the silver medal in the 4 × 1 lap relay (the lap is 180 m) during the 1972 Indoor European Championships at Grenoble alongside  Michèle Beugnet,  Christiane Marlet and Nicole Pani.

prize list

Records

notes and references

Sources 
 DocAthlé 2003, French Athletics Federation, p. 420

Living people
1947 births
French female sprinters
European Athletics Championships medalists
Place of birth missing (living people)